The 2011 COSAFA Women's Championship was the 4th edition of the COSAFA Women's Championship. Zimbabwe and South Africa played in the final.

Teams

Group stage

Group A

Group B

Knockout stage

Bracket

Semifinals

Third place playoff

Final

References

COSAFA Women's Championship
2011 in women's association football
COSAFA Women's Championship
COSAFA Women's Championship
COSAFA Women's Championship
International association football competitions hosted by Zimbabwe
COSAFA Championship